'''Salaxaad waa dagmo katirsan gobolka Erer ee dowlad degaanka somalida, waxayna magaalada fik ee xarunta gobolla ujirtaa 250-km dhinaca  Galbeed, waana magaalo caan ku ah xoolaha iyo malabka

Demographics 
Based on the 2007 Census conducted by the Central Statistical Agency of Ethiopia (CSA), this woreda has a total population of 290,082, of whom 200,675 are men and 89,407 women. While 12,or 15.43% are urban inhabitants, a further 217,561.5 or 75% are pastoralists. 100% of the population said they were Muslim.
This woreda is primarily inhabited by the Rer Diini Haji and Rer Sheikh Adan clan of sub Rer Aw Qudub of larger Sheikhaash the Somali people.

Notes 

Districts of Somali Region